Miguel Maury Buendía (born 19 November 1955) is a Spanish prelate of the Catholic Church who has spent his career in the diplomatic service of the Holy See. An archbishop since 2008, he has been Apostolic Nuncio to several countries, currently to both Romania and Moldova.

Biography
Miguel Maury Buendía was born in Madrid on 19 November 1955 to a family with Andalusian roots. He completed primary studies at the Jesuits' San Estanislao Kotska School in Málaga, his baccalaureate at the Ramiro de Maeztu Institute in Madrid, some music courses at the Royal Conservatory of Music of Madrid and obtained a degree in Geography and History, specialty of History of Art, from the Faculty of Philosophy and Letters of the Autonomous University of Madrid.
After studying philosophy and theology in the Conciliar Seminary of Madrid, he was ordained a priest of the Archdiocese of Madrid on 26 June 1980 by Vicente Enrique y Tarancón. On July 1 he was appointed vicar of the parish of the Holy Trinity of Collado Villalba, where he remained until October 1984. During military service, he served as chaplain of the Military Hospital of Barcelona and the Army High School.

He obtained a degree in dogmatic theology at the Pontifical University of Salamanca in 1985  and a doctorate in canon law at the Pontifical University of Santo Tomás in Urbe (Angelicum) in 1987.  After the two-year program of diplomatic studies at the Pontifical Ecclesiastical Academy of Rome, he entered the diplomatic service of the Holy See on 13 July 1987 and served as secretary in the apostolic nunciatures of Rwanda, Uganda, Morocco and Nicaragua (1987-1996) and as Counselor to those of Egypt, Slovenia and Ireland (1996-2004).

In addition to his work in the diplomatic service, he was a professor at the National Seminary of Nicaragua and the Italian Lyceum of Cairo. He has also been auxiliary chaplain of the Carabinieri and of the residence of the Little Sisters of the Abandoned Elderly in Rome.

Since 1 September 2004, he has had responsibility for Southeast Europe in the Section for Relations with States of the Secretariat of State of the Holy See. He has also represented the Holy See at various international conferences and congresses. He knows Italian, English, French, Slovene and Russian.

On 19 May 2008, Pope Benedict XVI appointed him titular archbishop of Italica and apostolic nuncio to Kazakhstan. On 12 July he was made nuncio to Kyrgyzstan and Tajikistan as well. On 12 June, he received his episcopal consecration from Cardinal Tarcisio Bertone.

On 5 December 2015, Pope Francis named him apostolic nuncio to Romania, adding on 25 January 2016 the position of apostolic nuncio to Moldova. Maury Buendía has an audience with Francis in January 2019 in anticipation of the papal visit to Romania in May 2019.

He has been awarded the Medal of the Order of Isabella the Catholic (Spain), Medal of the Equestrian Order of the Holy Sepulchre of Jerusalem, and Medal of the Order of Mercy (Kazakhstan).

See also
 List of heads of the diplomatic missions of the Holy See
 Catholic Church in Moldova
 Catholic Church in Romania

References

External links
 Catholic Hierarchy: Archbishop Miguel Maury Buendía 

1955 births
Living people
Pontifical University of Salamanca alumni 
Pontifical Ecclesiastical Academy alumni
Apostolic Nuncios to Kazakhstan
Apostolic Nuncios to Kyrgyzstan
Apostolic Nuncios to Tajikistan
Apostolic Nuncios to Romania
Apostolic Nuncios to Moldova